Yu Feihong (born 1971), also known as Faye Yu, is a Chinese actress and an occasional film director and producer, best known in the west for Wayne Wang's award-winning American films A Thousand Years of Good Prayers (2007) and The Joy Luck Club (1992). In the Chinese-speaking world she is best known for starring in a number of popular Chinese television series.

Biography
Yu was a child actress, having a lead role in the film The Murderer and the Craven (凶手与懦夫) when she was only 16. In 1991, while studying at the Beijing Film Academy, China's most prestigious film school, she became the first enrolled student in school history to be cast in a Hollywood production when Wayne Wang selected her for his film The Joy Luck Club. It took 3 months for her to receive an American visa, but Wang stuck with her. She returned to Beijing after filming, taught at the school for a while upon graduation, later studying in Los Angeles, before returning to China in 1998 to star in the television drama Hand-in-Hand (牵手) which became a huge domestic hit. She followed up on its success with Yuen Woo-ping's 1999 wuxia TV drama Legend of Dagger Li (小李飛刀), a Mainland-Taiwan co-production based on the popular Xiaoli Feidao novels.

Between 2005 and 2008 she only chose 1 acting project, A Thousand Years of Good Prayers, which briefly brought her back to the U.S. and reunited her with Wang. She spent most of her years then working on Eternal Beloved (愛有來生), her directorial debut that she also wrote (based on a novel), starred in, and produced. The film crashed in the Chinese box office, but won Yu the Best Directorial Debut Award at the Beijing College Student Film Festival.

Filmography

Film

TV Series

References
Yu Feihong juggles jobs in new film
Wayne Wang & Faye Yu Interviews
 38岁俞飞鸿：我是宅女，没有秘密结婚

External links
 Yufeihong.com (Yu Feihong's fan club)
 Yufeihong.blogspot.com

1971 births
Living people
Chinese film actresses
Chinese television actresses
20th-century Chinese actresses
Chinese child actresses
21st-century Chinese actresses
Actresses from Hangzhou
Chinese film directors
Film directors from Zhejiang
Chinese women film directors